Boston State Hospital is a historic mental hospital located in Mattapan and Dorchester, Massachusetts. The court case Rogers v. Okin, which increases patient consent rights, was filed by a class action lawsuit against the hospital. The hospital was closed in 1979, and has been completely demolished and the site is in the process of being redeveloped.

References

External links 
 . (Various documents).
 Institutionalization in Mattapan. Part II-Boston State Hospital

 
Defunct hospitals in Massachusetts
Demolished buildings and structures in Boston
Historic sites in Massachusetts
Psychiatric hospitals in Massachusetts